Plumbago caerulea is a species of flowering plant in the family Plumbaginaceae. It is native to South America.

References

caerulea
Plants described in 1818